St. Edmund's College may refer to:

St Edmund's College, Cambridge, a constituent college of the University of Cambridge
St Edmund's College, Salisbury, England, a collegiate church and later St Edmund's Church, Salisbury
St Edmund's College, Ware, a public school in Hertfordshire, England
St Edmund's College, Canberra, a Catholic school in Australia
St. Edmund's College, Shillong, a Catholic school in Meghalaya, India

See also
 St Edmund Hall, Oxford, a constituent college of the University of Oxford
 St Edmund's School (disambiguation)